Dr Ivan Ribar is an urban neighborhood of Belgrade, the capital of Serbia. It is located in Belgrade's municipality of New Belgrade.

Location 

Dr Ivan Ribar is the westernmost neighborhood in the western outskirts of Novi Beograd. It is narrow and rectangular, bordered on the east by Dr Ivan Ribar street and the neighborhood of Blokovi, and on the west by the mostly uninhabited field of Jasenovo. On the south it borders the embankment on the Sava river.

History 
As one of the last neighborhoods built in Novi Beograd before the collapse of the Serbian economy in the early 1990s, it initially was known only by its name. Later block numbers were assigned to it (as for most of Novi Beograd) so that the southern part of the neighborhood is now Block 71 and the northern part is Block 72, so far the two highest numbers of all the blocks.

On 25 June 2014, the municipal assembly of New Belgrade voted to establish the new local community, Dr Ivan Ribar. It occupies the southwest corner of New Belgrade, bordering the municipality of Surčin. Formed from the parts of the Bežanija Blocks and Sava local communities, it also occupies the Savski Nasip riparian zone.

In May 2022, city administration announced construction of the large Chinese shopping mall in Block 72. Company "Eurasia Trade Center" purchased two lots (total of ) for 821.2 million dinars (€7 million). It should replace the old Chinese center in Block 70, which was partially damaged in fire in August 2021. The location, in the extension of the Yuri Gagarin Street was originally proposed as the location of the city's new Buvljak (flea market) in 2017. Though city claimed they have no idea what the complex will look like, the design of the complex was revealed by the investor just two days later. The project includes construction of the extension of the Yuri Gagarin Street. Shop owners from the old center asked to stay on present location, asking help from the Chinese embassy, stating that the old shopping mall became recognizable brand in the city, but the embassy supported the construction of the new mall.

Characteristics 
The neighborhood is entirely residential. A gravel-selling facility is located on the bank of the Sava river, across the embankment.

A roundabout at the end of the neighborhood is a final stop for public transportation lines connecting the neighborhood with the downtown: buses number 73, 94, 95 and 604 and trams number 7, 9 and 11.

As of 2006, the wide area between the buildings closest to the river and the embankment was a 10-year-old unofficial landfill covered with waste and garbage and an environmental concern, especially due to frequent fires.

Dr Ivan Ribar was named after the Croatian-Yugoslav politician, Ivan Ribar (1881–1968).

References

Sources 
 

Neighborhoods of Belgrade
New Belgrade